Jobyna Howland (March 31, 1880 – June 7, 1936) was an American stage and screen actress.

Early years
Howland was born on March 31, 1880, in Indianapolis, Indiana. Her parents were Joby Howland, a Civil War veteran who at age 11 was one of the youngest enlistees in the conflict, and his wife Mary C. Bunting. She was given the feminine version of her father's name. Her brother was character actor Olin Howland. Tall, regal and beautiful, red-haired Howland was one of several models for Charles Dana Gibson's famous sketches of Gibson Girls.

Career 

Having performed as an amateur actress, Howland left her Denver, Colorado, home to seek professional work on stage. In December 1897, Howland appeared in A Milk White Flag at the Tacoma Theater in Tacoma, Washington. She also performed in San Francisco. There she joined a company headed by Clay Clement and went on tour with him.

Howland attracted the attention of a photographer named Thors. His photographs of her were published in the Illustrated American and attracted the attention of Gibson. She worked professionally as a model, beginning her posing a week after she arrived in New York, and she had become a model for Gibson before a month elapsed.

She made her first appearance on the New York Stage in 1899 managed by Daniel Frohman. During her long theatrical career, she apprenticed everything from drawing room farces to musical comedies always seeming to play the other woman, a best friend's pal or a distant cousin. She didn't achieve the kind of stardom of other beautiful actresses such as Elsie Ferguson, but was content to play the amiable and much needed support so vital in numerous Broadway productions.

She decided to try her luck in film and moved to a Lloyd Wright (Frank Lloyd Wright, Jr.) bungalow in Beverly Hills which was maintained by Hernando, a Navajo servant who liked to sample Howland's makeup. She appeared in a few silent pictures, but this medium did not seem to suit her booming, direct and distinct voice. In sound films, she typically played the kind of roles she had mastered on the stage, the domineering but dependable support. Her appearances in the comedies of Bert Wheeler & Robert Woolsey are some of her best known.

Howland's Broadway debut came as Queen Flavia in Rupert of Hentzau (1899), and her final Broadway role was Amy Bellaire in O Evening Star (1936).

Personal life and death 
Howland married Arthur Stringer in 1903, but the marriage didn't last and was dissolved in 1914. She bore no children.

On June 7, 1936, Howland was found dead at age 56  on the kitchen floor of her home. Police attributed her death to heart disease. She is interred in Forest Lawn Memorial Park in Glendale, California.

Filmography
Her Only Way (1918)
The Way of a Woman (1919)
Second Youth (1924)
Honey (1930)
The Cuckoos (1930)
Dixiana (1930)
The Virtuous Sin (1930)
A Lady's Morals (1930)
Hook, Line and Sinker (1930)
Stepping Sisters (1932)
Big City Blues (1932) as Serena Cartlich
Once in a Lifetime (1932)
Rockabye (1932)
Silver Dollar (1932) (uncredited)
Topaze (1933)
The Cohens and Kellys in Trouble (1933)
The Story of Temple Drake (1933)
Meet the Baron (1933) (uncredited)
Ye Olde Saw Mill (1935) (short)

References

External links

 
 
 Jobyna Howland portrait gallery New York Public Library, Billy Rose Collection
 Jobyna Howland: Broadway Photographs(Univ. of South Carolina)

1880 births
1936 deaths
19th-century American actresses
American stage actresses
20th-century American actresses
American film actresses
Actresses from Indianapolis